Machchhu River is a river in Gujarat, India, with its origin in the Madla hills. The river is also occasionally transliterated as Machhu River.

1979 dam failure 

On 11 August 1979, the Machchhu-2 dam, situated on the river, failed, sending a wall of water through the city of Morbi. Estimates of the number of people killed vary greatly, ranging from 1,800 to 25,000.

2022 suspension bridge collapse 

On 30 October 2022, a suspension bridge in the city of Morbi that crossed the river collapsed. Hundreds of people were on the bridge at the time and at least 141 people died. The accident occurred just four days after the bridge was reopened following repairs.

In popular culture
In 1984, a Gujarati film named Machchu Tara Vaheta Pani starring Upendra Trivedi, Arvind Trivedi, Chandrakant Pandya, Narayan Rajgor, Minal Patel, and Kamini Bhatia was released which was directed by Vibhakar Mehta.

See also 
 1979 Machchhu dam failure

References

Rivers of Gujarat
Rivers of India